Marcel Silva Cardoso or simply Marcel (born May 31, 1983 in Uberlândia), is a Brazilian left back, he currently plays for Uberaba Sport Club.

Contract
Vila Nova May 2, 2008 to 30 November 2008

External links
CBF

1983 births
Living people
Brazilian footballers
Clube Atlético Mineiro players
Clube de Regatas Brasil players
Association football defenders